Alcazar is a Swedish nu-disco group. Alcazar is one of Sweden's most successful music groups both nationally and internationally with a string of hits since their debut single in 1999. Worldwide, Alcazar sold over 12 million records between 2001 and 2004. Alcazar also had success globally in 2000 with their song "Crying at the Discoteque", having charted in USA, Brazil, Australia, Japan and most countries in Europe.

Alcazar disbanded in August 2011 after a concert at Stockholm Pride. They reunited again in 2013 ahead of Melodifestivalen 2014.

Band career
The group formed in 1998, with three members: Andreas Lundstedt, Tess Merkel, and Annika ‘Annikafiore’ Kjærgaard (née Johansson). Their first single, "Shine On", was a hit in Sweden, but it was with their second release, "Crying at the Discoteque" (which heavily sampled Sheila and B. Devotion's 1979 hit "Spacer"), that they achieved success across Europe.

Both singles appeared on their album, Casino, written and produced by fellow Swedes Alexander Bard and Anders Hansson.

Later editions of Casino contain a cover of The Human League's hit "Don't You Want Me", which also served as the third single off the album. In the United States, Alcazar gained moderate success. "Crying at the Discoteque" peaked at No. 44 and "Don't You Want Me" peaked at No. 30 on the Hot Dance Music/Club Play.

In December 2002, Lundstedt's boyfriend at the time, Magnus Carlsson, joined the group. Their second album, Alcazarized, was released in Sweden in 2003 and became a big hit. It was released internationally in 2004 with new cover artwork and a slightly different track list. In September 2004, Alcazar released "This Is the World We Live In". The song samples Diana Ross's 1980 hit single "Upside Down" and re-uses the lyrics and melody from Genesis' 1986 single "Land of Confusion".

Their follow-up single, "Physical", also sampled an older hit: Londonbeat's "I've Been Thinking About You". The singles were followed up by the album Dancefloor Deluxe, which was released in Sweden in August 2004. In the winter of 2004/2005 they released the Christmas single "Here I Am". Alcazar enjoyed considerable success in 2004 in their home country, Sweden.

2005 saw the release of the single "Start the Fire". During the making of its music video, Kjærgaard had an accident in which she broke her foot.

In the autumn of 2005, the band decided to take a break. Lundstedt moved on to musicals and played the lead in Saturday Night Fever, while Tess became a professional poker player.

In May 2007, the band did a one-off performance in London at the night club G-A-Y, together with Swedish colleagues BWO and Army of Lovers, and invited their friend Lina Hedlund to join them on stage. It all turned out to be a very successful combination and a few months later the "New Alcazar" was formed.

In January 2008, their first and comeback single "We Keep on Rockin'", written and produced by Anders Hansson, was released. The single quickly turned into a hit and only a week after the release the single passed gold status in sales. In March 2009, the new album Disco Defenders was released in Sweden. The album contains two discs. CD one: 12 brand new tracks including "We Keep on Rockin´", "Burning", "Harlem Nights", and "Stay the Night". CD two: 11 best of songs, among them "Crying at the Discoteque", "This Is the World We Live In" and "Don't You Want Me". Disco Defenders received great reviews from the Swedish critics.

In 2010, Alcazar recorded a duet with British pop group Same Difference, the song was entitled "Karma Karma". It was included on Same Difference's second album The Rest Is History.  Although not officially released as a single, the song charted on Swedish iTunes thanks to Alcazar's popularity in their homeland.

Alcazar is also working on a their fourth studio album. The follow-up to 2009's Disco Defenders will include songwriting by German newcomer Victor Finke. The new single "Good Lovin" was released in August 2014.

Melodifestivalen
Alcazar have taken part in Melodifestivalen, the annual competition that selects Sweden's entries for the Eurovision Song Contest, on 5 occasions. In 2003, "Not a Sinner, Nor a Saint" initially failed to qualify for the final, but got a wildcard in the second chance round, finishing 3rd overall. However, the song eventually became the biggest hit of all participating songs in Melodifestivalen 2003. It was Alcazar's first number 1 single in Sweden and was certified Gold.

During early 2005 Alcazar was offered a spot in the United Kingdom national selection for Eurovision Song Contest 2005 but refused the offer. Instead they tried their luck in Melodifestivalen 2005 with the disco tune "Alcastar". As in 2003, they originally failed to qualify for the final, but eventually made it through after the second chance semi-final. Once again, the group again had to settle for the 3rd place in the final, which was won by Martin Stenmarck's song "Las Vegas". Still, the song was a hit and became Alcazar's second number 1 single in Sweden.

Alcazar participated in Melodifestivalen 2009, this time with the song "Stay the Night". After performing the song during the first semifinal in Scandinavium, Gothenburg, they finished in the top 2 of a Melodifestivalen semifinal for the first time, thus qualifying directly for the final. In the final in Globen, having placed third with the regional juries and fourth in the televote, the song finished fifth overall. The song managed to peak at number 2 on Swedish Singles Charts giving Alcazar another Top 10 single in Sweden. Alcazar also participated in Melodifestivalen 2010 with the song "Headlines", written and produced by Tony Nilsson and Peter Boström, they made it to the second chance round but failed to reach the final.

On 23 February 2013 they were reunited when they came out with a "best of hits" in the Melodifestivalen 2013 in Malmö, Swedish singer Danny Saucedo also joined the band.

On 28 November 2013, it was announced that the band would compete for a fifth time in Melodifestivalen 2014 with the song "Blame It on the Disco". The band competed in the fourth semi-final and made it to the final in Friends Arena on 8 March. They once again finished in 3rd place.

On 1 May it was revealed that Alcazar would be spokespersons, presenting the voting result for Sweden in the Eurovision 2014 final on 10 May.

Break and line-up changes

The band announced that they needed a break during March 2005. Lundstedt stated that the band would be back in the summer of 2007. In the meantime the male members launched solo careers. Lundstedt had appeared in the Eurovision Song Contest 2006, as a member of six4one, a multinational band founded for the sole purpose of representing Switzerland at the contest, whilst Carlsson has twice taken part individually in the Swedish Melodifestivalen.

Lina Hedlund was announced as the replacement for Annikafiore. The band now includes Tess Merkel and Hedlund as female vocalists, and Lundstedt as male vocalist.

Performances
Alcazar reformed in July 2007 to perform at the London Astoria as part of a celebration of Swedish music masterminded by producer Alexander Bard of Army of Lovers fame. They performed at the G-A-Y event on 21 July 2007 alongside BWO and a reformed-for-the-occasion cult band Army of Lovers. They performed three songs, "This Is the World We Live In", "Start the Fire" and "Crying at the Discoteque". However, when pressed at the end of their set by club proprietor Jeremy Joseph on whether the band would reform, Andreas avoided offering a commitment other than that they would do future one-off appearances at G-A-Y.

The band performed again on 5 July 2008, at G-A-Y Astoria for Pride London 2008.  They sang "This Is the World We Live In", "Sexual Guarantee/Don't You Want Me" and "Crying at the Discoteque" after BWO, and ended with a cover version of the Lipps Inc. song "Funkytown" with BWO joining them on stage. They also performed on 28 June 2008 in Bologna for the Italian national Gay Pride parade. On 31 December 2008, Alcazar once again appeared at G-A-Y at its new location, Heaven.

All five members of the band reunited at EuroPride 2018.

In 2020, the band briefly reformed to perform at the Melodifestivalen 2020 Hall of Fame which Lina was hosting.

Discography

 Casino (2000)
 Alcazarized (2003)
 Disco Defenders (2009)

References

External links
2002 Interview with Alcazar by Jake McGee
Alcazar Official Website 

 
Swedish musical trios
Musical groups established in 1998
Swedish dance music groups
Swedish pop music groups
Swedish Eurodance groups
Swedish electronic music groups
Musical groups disestablished in 2011
Sony Music Publishing artists
Schlager groups
Europop groups
Nu-disco musicians
1998 establishments in Sweden
English-language singers from Sweden
Melodifestivalen contestants of 2014
Melodifestivalen contestants of 2010
Melodifestivalen contestants of 2009
Melodifestivalen contestants of 2005
Melodifestivalen contestants of 2003